Bader Al-Hagbani (born 17 January 1979) is a Saudi Arabian footballer who plays as a central midfielder.

Honours
With Al-Shabab
Saudi Premier League: 2004, 2006, 
Saudi Champions Cup: 2008, 2009

References

External links
 
 

1979 births
Living people
Saudi Arabian footballers
Saudi Arabia international footballers
Saudi Arabia youth international footballers
Association football midfielders
Al Nassr FC players
Al-Shabab FC (Riyadh) players
Al-Fateh SC players
Najran SC players
Saudi Professional League players
Saudi First Division League players